Flo-Master was a brand of inks and markers in the latter half of the 20th century, remembered particularly for the colorful opacity of the inks. These markers were designed for marking on glass, and became weapons of choice among New York City writers of the Original School of NYC Writin' in the 1970s and early 1980s.

History
Cushman & Denison first introduced Flo-Master "refillable markers" in 1951, which targeted store owners and advertisers with limited success. In 1953, Esterbrook America took over the company in the United States, and Esterbrook Pens and Cushman & Denison merged in 1960 in the United Kingdom. To counter a precipitous fall-off in its business following World War II, Esterbrook worked to develop new and innovative products, and the years 1960 to 1967 saw steady progress.

Under the Gem brand name, the company launched its highly successful Mark I line of products, featuring the "Valve Marker" and the "Permanent Pen." Flo-Master brand inks were used in many of these products, and was also sold separately for refills, marketed in handy tin cans equipped with "needle-nose" plastic nozzles. In 1967, the Venus Pencil Company bought out the Esterbrook Pen Company, resulting in the formation of Venus Esterbrook.

Impact
In the Russian language фломастер (flomaster) has become a common name for any marker pen (regardless of actual brand). The same is true for many other Slavic languages, e. g. Ukrainian, Polish, Bosnian, Bulgarian, Croatian, Serbian or Slovene, and the Baltic languages (Lithuanian and Latvian), as well as in the Egyptian dialect of Arabic.

When street-writing took to the subways in New York City at the start of the 1970s, Flo-Master opaque inks were the natural choice for graffiti artists, as they adhered to virtually any surface permanently. In addition, the ink was not only opaque on glass, but covered up pre-existing writing as well.

These unique properties allowed subway writers to "toy out" rivals, obliterating old "tags" with new ones. Flo-Master inks were not only colorful and durable; in addition, the design of their cans allowed for portability, quick refilling and artful "pointing" and "edging" of "Uni-Wide" and "Mini-Wide" markers—designed for "ribbon"-style writing on glass—which were extremely popular with early graffiti writers as well.

Decline
Due to its high lead content—the ingredient which gave Flo-Master inks their distinctive attributes—production was suspended by regulation. The once bright and durable Flo-Master inks faded from history, contributing to the end of the Golden Age of American graffiti by the mid-1980s.

References

Inks
Pens